Bacopa monnieri is a perennial, creeping herb native to the wetlands of southern and Eastern India, Australia, Europe, Africa, Asia, and North and South America. It is known by the common names water hyssop, waterhyssop, brahmi, thyme-leafed gratiola, herb of grace, and Indian pennywort. Bacopa monnieri is used in Ayurveda. In 2019, the US Food and Drug Administration (FDA) warned manufacturers of dietary supplement products containing Bacopa monnieri against making illegal and unproven claims that the herb can treat various diseases.

Description

Bacopa monnieri is a non-aromatic herb. Leaves are oblanceolate and are arranged oppositely on the stem. The flowers are small, actinomorphic and white, with four to five petals. It can even grow in slightly brackish conditions. Propagation is often achieved through cuttings.

Ecology
Bacopa monnieri is one of the most widespread Bacopa species. It commonly grows in marshy areas throughout India, Nepal, Sri Lanka, China, Pakistan, Taiwan, Vietnam, tropical and southern Africa, on Madagascar, in Australia, in the Caribbean as well as in Middle and South America. It is also found in  Florida, Louisiana, Texas, and Hawaii.

It used to be found growing wild in freshwater swamps of Singapore and nearby regions known as beremi.

Research and regulation
Bacopa monnieri is used in Ayurvedic traditional medicine to improve memory and to treat various ailments. Reviews of preliminary research found that Bacopa monnieri may improve cognition, although the effect was measurable only after several weeks of use.

In 2019, the FDA issued warning letters to manufacturers of dietary supplements containing Bacopa monnieri that advertised health claims for treating or preventing stomach disease, Alzheimer's disease, hypoglycemia, blood pressure, and anxiety were unproven and illegal. The FDA stated that Bacopa monnieri products have not been approved for these or any medical purposes.

Adverse effects
The most commonly reported adverse effects of Bacopa monnieri in humans are nausea, increased intestinal motility, and gastrointestinal upset.

Phytochemistry
The best characterized phytochemicals  in Bacopa monnieri are dammarane-type triterpenoid saponins known as bacosides, with jujubogenin or pseudo-jujubogenin moieties as aglycone units. Bacosides comprise a family of 12 known analogs. Other saponins called bacopasides I–XII were identified. The alkaloids brahmine, nicotine, and herpestine have been catalogued, along with D-mannitol, apigenin, hersaponin, monnierasides I–III, cucurbitacin and plantainoside B.

References

External links

Dr. Duke's Databases: Bacopa monnieri, list of chemicals
UC Photos gallery — Bacopa monnieri

Plantaginaceae
Aquatic plants
Flora of Africa
Flora of the Caribbean
Flora of North America
Flora of Oceania
Flora of South America
Flora of temperate Asia
Flora of Indo-China
Flora of the Indian subcontinent
Flora of Malesia
Flora of the Southeastern United States
Medicinal plants of Asia
Medicinal plants of North America
Medicinal plants of Oceania
Nootropics
Health fraud